Events from the year 1854 in China.

Incumbents 
 Xianfeng Emperor (4th year)

Viceroys
 Viceroy of Zhili —  Guiliang

Events 

 Nian Rebellion
 Taiping Rebellion
 Miao Rebellion (1854–73)
 Red Turban Rebellion (1854–1856)
 the first Chinese laborers arrive in Jamaica